Aílton de Oliveira Modesto (born 27 February 1980), known as Aílton, is a Brazilian former professional footballer who played as a midfielder.

Club statistics

References

External links

Kawasaki Frontale

1980 births
Living people
Brazilian footballers
Santos FC players
Kawasaki Frontale players
Esporte Clube Santo André players
Sociedade Esportiva Matonense players
Portimonense S.C. players
Panachaiki F.C. players
Apollon Pontou FC players
AEP Paphos FC players
Londrina Esporte Clube players

União Esporte Clube players
Santa Helena Esporte Clube players
Agremiação Sportiva Arapiraquense players
Dibba Al-Hisn Sports Club players
Brusque Futebol Clube players
Mixto Esporte Clube players
Morrinhos Futebol Clube players
Sinop Futebol Clube players
Operário Futebol Clube (Várzea Grande) players
Associação Esportiva Tiradentes players
Clube Atlético Votuporanguense players
Campeonato Brasileiro Série A players
Liga Portugal 2 players
J2 League players
Super League Greece players
Super League Greece 2 players
Cypriot First Division players
Brazilian expatriate footballers
Expatriate footballers in Japan
Brazilian expatriate sportspeople in Japan
Expatriate footballers in Portugal
Brazilian expatriate sportspeople in Portugal
Expatriate footballers in Greece
Brazilian expatriate sportspeople in Greece
Expatriate footballers in Cyprus
Brazilian expatriate sportspeople in Cyprus
Expatriate footballers in the United Arab Emirates
Brazilian expatriate sportspeople in the United Arab Emirates
Association football midfielders